Donkey Serenade is an independent album released by Australian rock band Weddings Parties Anything comprising four cover versions (Canada's The Lowest of the Low's "Rosy and Grey", Bob Dylan's "If You Gotta Go", Strange Tennants' "Grey Skies" and The Triffids' "Wide Open Road"), four new songs written or co-written by Michael Thomas and a couple of old songs re-recorded, "Nothing Left to Say".

The album (released on CD and cassette) was only available by mail order, via the band's website.  The album featured a new bass player Stephen 'Irish' O'Prey, formerly of The Badloves, drummer Michael Barclay, and violinist Jen Anderson (The Black Sorrows) who became an official instead of part-time member of the band.

Track listing
 "Where the Highway Meets the Cane" (Mick Thomas) - 3:41
 "In a City, Girl" (Stephen O'Prey, Mick Thomas) - 3:32
 "Grey Skies" (Ian Hearn) - 3:45
 "Rosy and Grey" (Ron Hawkins) - 5:18
 "Wide Open Road" (David McComb) - 4:18
 "Nothing Left to Say" (Mick Thomas) - 2:51
 "A Long Time Between Drinks" (Mick Thomas, Mark Wallace) - 3:45
 "If You Gotta Go" (Bob Dylan) - 3:19
 "In Your Memory" (Mick Thomas) - 6:17 
 "Untitled Track" - 2:40

Personnel
 Jen Anderson - mandolin, vocals 
 Michael Barclay - drums, vocals 
 Stephen O'Prey - bass, vocals 
 Mick Thomas - guitar, mandolin, vocals 
 Paul Thomas - guitar, pedal steel, vocals 
 Mark Wallace - accordion, keyboards, vocals

References

1995 albums
Weddings Parties Anything albums